Terry Clarke may refer to:

Terry Clarke (drummer) (born 1944), Canadian jazz drummer
Terry Clarke (Ontario politician), Canadian former mayor of Huntsville, Ontario

See also
Terri Clark (born 1968), Canadian country musician
Terry Clark (disambiguation)
Terence Clarke (disambiguation)